The Walking Dead: Road to Survival is a role-playing video game for Android and iOS, based on the comic book series The Walking Dead by Robert Kirkman, as well as the story of The Walking Dead TV series writer Jay Bonansinga. Road to Survival was developed by Scopely and co-created with IUGO Mobile Entertainment.

Initially released in Australia on the Android platform, the game was officially launched in the U.S. on 27 August 2015 on Android and iOS.

On December 10, 2015, Scopely combined with Telltale Games to use some of their characters from The Walking Dead and made adaptations of scenes from episodes in the game as well as additional tie-ins featuring the same characters, in the Scopely release.

Plot
The app contains a story mode, which follows the journey of an unnamed protagonist (controlled by the player) and handful of other survivors in a zombie apocalypse. Player's actions will have an effect on the story, and they are given multiple choices throughout the game.

The player character encounters characters from the comic series, Telltale's video game series and the novel series, as well as completely new original characters unique to the app.

Reception 
Gamezebo described the game as a "mature role-playing video game"', in their First Impression Review, comparing the gameplay to Clash of Clans. Modojo stated that it was a 'clone of other resource management sims' that are already available on the mobile platform, describing it also as a "mature [role-playing game]", more so than an "action game".

The game went to number 1 on the iOS App Store upon release.

References

External links 
 Developer Scopely website
 Developer IUGOME website

2015 video games
Android (operating system) games
IOS games
Multiplayer and single-player video games
Scopely games
Video games developed in Canada
Video games set in Georgia (U.S. state)
Road to Survival